Kharkovka is a rural locality (a selo) in Novomikhaylovsky Selsoviet of Oktyabrsky District, Amur Oblast, Russia. The population was 70 as of 2018. There is 1 street.

Geography 
Kharkovka is located on the right bank of the Zavitaya River, 42 km south of Yekaterinoslavka (the district's administrative centre) by road. Platovo is the nearest rural locality.

References 

Rural localities in Oktyabrsky District, Amur Oblast